Vicious is the fourth studio album by American rock band Halestorm. It was released on July 27, 2018 through Atlantic Records. Four singles were released, three of them having a music video.  The video for the lead single "Uncomfortable" was directed by Evan Brace.

The album peaked at number 8 on the Billboard 200 and topped both the US and UK Rock Albums charts.

Background and production
The American rock band Halestorm released their third studio album, Into the Wild Life, on April 10, 2015. This was followed up with 2017's Reanimate 3.0: The Covers EP, produced by Nick Raskulinecz. The band ended up discarding 15 songs, as frontwoman Lzzy Hale became displeased with the material out of fear that she was "paying way too much attention to making everybody happy." The band reunited with Raskulinecz in Nashville, Tennessee's Rock Falcon studio for what began as a series of live jam sessions. By February 2018, Hale announced that the new album was "almost done," and that Halestorm had "about two or three weeks left of recording just to put the cherries on top."

Composition and lyrics
Lzzy Hale commented to Blabbermouth.net:

When discussing the album artwork with Sound Vapors, Joe Hottinger said:

Release and promotion
Halestorm announced the details of their new album, including the name, track list, and release date, on May 30, 2018. The announcement was accompanied by the album's first single, "Uncomfortable", and a music video directed by Evan Brace, who previously directed videos for Phantogram and Taking Back Sunday. On June 22, the band released "Black Vultures." The last pre-album single, "Do Not Disturb," was released on July 20, a week before Vicious. The song was accompanied by a video directed by Robert Schober, also known as Roboshobo, who previously worked with Metallica, Alice in Chains, Mastodon, Disturbed, and Green Day.

To promote Vicious, Halestorm went on tour with support from In This Moment and New Year's Day, a decision that Lzzy Hale said was made because "It's important to realize that music is gender-less." Hottinger says, "We were told by the third show [on the tour] that there were more females buying tickets than males, which in hard rock, we have never seen before."

Reception

Critical reception

Vicious has received a score of 81 on Metacritic based on four reviews indicating "universal acclaim", making it the band's highest scoring album on the site. James Christopher Monger at AllMusic wrote that "The holy hard rock trinity of sex, drugs, and rock & roll is alive and well -- but it connects on such a visceral and familiar level that listeners will likely be unable to resist the urge to turn things up to 11." Stephen Dalton of Classic Rock wrote, "Sounding at times like a fire-breathing she-dragon, Hale has a flair for lyrically deft rebel-girl songs that wear their feminist credentials lightly." Paul Davies of the Daily Express wrote, "There are more hooks, delicious vocals and musicianship here to reel in both avid fans and casual listeners.

Commercial performance 
Vicious debuted at number eight on the US Billboard 200 chart, recording 29,000 album-equivalent units in its first week. As of November 2021, the album has earned 140,000 equivalent album units in the US.

Accolades
Loudwire included Vicious at number five on their year-end list of the "30 Best Hard Rock Albums of 2018." Classic Rock also put Vicious at number five on their list of the "50 Best Albums Of 2018."

"Uncomfortable" was nominated for Best Rock Performance at the 2019 Grammy Awards, losing to Chris Cornell's "When Bad Does Good."

Track listing
All tracks are produced by Nick Raskulinecz.

Notes
  Though listed as being recorded in Philadelphia, the track was actually recorded in Camden, New Jersey.

Personnel

Halestorm
 Lzzy Hale – vocals, guitar, piano, synths, talk box on "Buzz"
 Arejay Hale – drums, backing vocals
 Joe Hottinger – lead guitar, backing vocals, synths
 Josh Smith – bass guitar, piano, backing vocals, synths

Additional credits
 Suzi Akyuz – product manager
 David Brown – guitar technician
 Rock Falcon – drum technician
 Jimmy Fontaine – photography
 Ted Jensen – mastering
 Nik Karpen – mixing assistance
 Alex Kirzhner – creative direction and design
 Jordan Logue – assistance
 Chris Lord-Alge – mixing
 Brian Ranney – packaging manager
 Nick Raskulinecz – producer
 Scott Stevens – additional production
 Nathan Yarborough – engineering

Charts

Stripped EP
Almost two years after the release of the album, the band debuted the Vicious (Stripped) EP for Record Store day 2020. The album features acoustic versions of four songs from the album as well as an acoustic version of "Chemicals", which was released as a non album promo single the previous year.

References

2018 albums
Halestorm albums
Glam metal albums